Otto Hornung (1920 in Ostrava – 8 January 2013) was a distinguished philatelist and philatelic journalist who won Gold medals at several philatelic exhibitions and was a Fellow of The Royal Philatelic Society London. He signed the Roll of Distinguished Philatelists in 1993 and lived in Wembley, London.

Early life 
Whilst in Ostrava, Hornung witnessed the German invasion of Czechoslovakia in March 1939 but managed to escape to Bogumin, then in unoccupied Poland, dressed as a postman in the mail wagon of a goods train. After that he joined the Czechoslovak Legion. Hornung spoke Polish and Czech fluently as both were used freely in Ostrava.

Philatelic career 
Hornung was a former Secretary of the Philatelic Traders Society and organiser of the Stampex show. He was also a founder member of the Association Internationale des Journalistes Philateliques (AIJP) in 1952 and its former President. As a philatelist, Hornung specialised in the stamps and postal history of Turkey and won Large Gold medals at India 1989, New Zealand 1990, London 1990, Philatokyo 1991 and Granada 1992.

Philatelic memberships 
Hornung was a member of the following societies (amongst others):
Czechoslovak Philatelic Society of Great Britain
The Oriental Philatelic Association of London
International Association of Philatelic Journalists
Royal Philatelic Society London

Philatelic publications 
The Illustrated Encyclopedia of Stamp Collecting, Hamlyn, London, 1970. 
Wie Sammle Ich Richtig Briefmarken, Verlag Werner Dausien, 1972.  (German language)
The Czecho-Slovak Legion in Poland and Russia 1939-1945 and Czechoslovaks in the Middle East, 1940 - 1943, Czechoslovak Philatelic Society of Great Britain, 2003. (With Dr. Vratislav Palkoska)
The Early Postal History of Carpatho-Ukraine with Particular Reference to The Usage Of The First Postage Stamps of Austria, 2007.

References

External links 
Photograph of Otto Hornung.
Virtual exhibit on Carpatho-Ukraine at Exponet.

Writers from Ostrava
Philatelists
1920 births
Fellows of the Royal Philatelic Society London
2013 deaths
Signatories to the Roll of Distinguished Philatelists
Czechoslovak emigrants to the United Kingdom